Sergio Passarella Marone (born February 4, 1981) is a Brazilian actor. He has appeared in numerous soap operas and recently posed for the Brazilian website "Paparazzo".

Biography 
Student of law, also attended the workshops of the group TAPA and the Teatro Escola Macunaíma in SP.

It premiered on TV in 2001 in the TV soap opera "Globo TV", in the role of the mysterious paranormal Santhiago, who protected the Crystal character (Sandy) from the frames of the villainous Charles Charles (Rodrigo Santoro).
In 2001 it gained its first role as Cecéu in the 8 PM soap"The Clone (2001)". In the plot, his character was lovingly involved with a girl addicted to drugs, interpreted by Deborah Falabella. Cecéu ends up getting hooked too and starts a fight to turn around and end the addiction. The novel was a success and this plot involved the public in such a way that put the actor at the top of the ranks as the most received letter in the cast of TV Globo.

In 2002 he made his theater debut in the comedy "Secrets Only Men Have" adapted from the circuit off broadway by Bruno Mazzeo and Evandro Mesquita, who also directed and performed in the show that shot the country in the theaters of the main capitals.

In 2003 lived the protagonist Victor in Malhação, juvenile series of the TV Globo.
When he ended his participation in the youth series he returned to the theater to make the controversial comedy of Lauro Cezar Muniz, "The Holy Child" directed by Luis Artur Nunes, alongside Roberto Bomtempo and José de Abreu, Had 5 nominations for the Shell Prize of RJ, the most important prize of the Brazilian theater and they went through diverse festivals of theater like those of Angra and Curitiba. The debut, in RJ, was controversial, came out on the cover of the main culture notebooks of the country's newspapers, a photo of the ex-man of "Malhação" kissing another actor (Roberto Bomtempo), in one of the scenes of the part.

In 2005 he made Rafa, a diver who is paraplegic in the novel "Like a Wave" TV Globo.

In 2006/2007 he staged "Escravas do Amor" adaptation and direction of João Fonseca from the chronicles of Suzana Flag (Nelson Rodrigues) with Cia Fodidos and Privilegiados. They had 2 nominations to the Shell Prize, costumes and direction. Marone co-produced a two-month special season of the show at Leblon in January and February 2007, thus having his first experience as an actor / producer.

In 2006, he returned to TV making a special participation in "Cobras & Lagartos", in his last chapters, playing Miguel, a boyfriend of Letícia (Cléo Pires), forming a love triangle between Letícia (Cléo Pires) and Luciano (Carmo Dalla Vecchia).

Also in 2006 he made his film debut in the film "Dreams and Desires", as Vaslav, a dancer who abandoned his art to dedicate himself to the fight against the dictatorship alongside his friend Saulo (Felipe Camargo). Directed by Marcelo Santhiago the film went through some festivals, taking 2 prizes in the Gramado.

In January and February 2010. Exactly a week after finishing  Caras & Bocas  premieres in SP, "PLay-On sex, lies and videotape" by Rodrigo Nogueira, direction Ivan Sugahara. They had been nominated to Shell and APTR as the best text. Freely inspired by the movie "Sex, lies and video tape," the play revolved around the country's main stages until the beginning of 2011.

In 2011, he made his third villain, Marcos, of  Morde & Assopra. This time the character had a more serious villain tone.

In 2012 without even contract with Rede Globo he makes a participation in the novelinha Malhação where he already worked.

In the years of 2012 and 2013, the contest Miss Brazil, transmitted by Band.

Filmography

References 

1981 births
Living people
Brazilian male film actors
Brazilian male telenovela actors
Brazilian male stage actors
Brazilian male voice actors
Brazilian people of Italian descent
Male actors from São Paulo